Tisvildeleje is the village and coastal part of the area known as Tisvilde located on the north coast of the island Zealand (Sjælland) in Denmark 60 km/40miles north of Copenhagen in Region Hovedstaden.

To the West, Tisvildeleje is bordered by the protected plantation of Tisvilde Hegn [hegn=fence], which is Denmark’s fifth largest forest. The beaches of Tisvildeleje, are known for their white sands and soft dunes.

The beach uses large boulders as rock armour and groynes for sea defense in most places. A sea wall also protects a stretch of the coast.

History

The name "Tisvilde" is derived from "Ti's vælde", meaning a place dedicated to the God Tyr. Where the church of Tibirke Kirke is situated nowadays, there was once a prehistoric “vi” meaning a holy place or place of sacrifice. In prehistoric times, humans were sacrificed here. At the foot of the church, is a spring which may have been a place of pilgrimage in days of old. "Leje" roughly translates as plain and used to be a fishermen's village. Now most of the fishermen's houses, are used as summer residences.
 
Helene Spring in Tisvildeleje is located close to the sea and is among Denmark’s most famous springs. Legend has it, that anyone whose illness has not responded successfully to other forms of treatment, must come to the spring on 23 June, Sankt Hans or Midsummer's Eve. Draw the amount of water you expect to drink in the course of the night and then direct your steps towards Helene’s grave; stretched out there, drink of the mystic health-giving water, and when the morning light has finally dawned afresh, you will be cured of your ills. Helene's Tomb is now a rectangular, grazed area surrounded by low stone fences. The two boulders leaning against each other indicate Helene's Tomb. It is located at Sankt Helenevej, 3220 Tisvildeleje.

Sources
 Domino Helena Old writings about Tisvilde  accessdate = 2012-01-16

External links
 Source
 Heatherhill
 Source

Geography of Denmark